Dagny Servaes (10 March 1894 – 10 July 1961) was a German-Austrian stage and film actress. In the theatre she appeared in the productions of Max Reinhardt and Berthold Brecht. Servaes appeared in around sixty films during her career, initially in lead and later in supporting roles. One of her earliest screen performances was in the 1917 propaganda film Dr. Hart's Diary. She also voiced the character of the evil queen in a German language dub of Disney's Snow White and the Seven Dwarfs made for the Austrian market in 1938.

Personal life
Servaes was born in Berlin in the German Empire (present day Germany) to parents Martha (née Haese) and Franz Theodor Hubert Servaes. She had with Erwin Goldarbeiter, a daughter, Evi Servaes, who also became an actress in movies and on stage. She had a brother, Roderich Servaes, whose son Arnim became a stage actor as well. Through her father, she was cousins with Vice Admiral Reginald Servaes. She is also distant cousins to English actor Tom Hiddleston.

Selected filmography
 Dr. Hart's Diary (1917)
 The Loves of Pharaoh (1922)
 Peter the Great (1922)
 Adam and Eve (1923)
 The Tales of Hoffmann (1923)
 Carlos and Elisabeth (1924)
 Modern Marriages (1924)
 In the Name of the King (1924)
 Remembrance (1924)
 Colonel Redl (1925)
 Fadette (1926)
 The Student of Prague (1926)
 Grand Hotel (1927)
 The Weavers (1927)
 Golgotha (1933)
 Florentine (1937)
 Nanon (1938)
 A Prussian Love Story (1938)
 Mirror of Life (1938)
 The Deruga Case (1938)
 Immortal Waltz (1939)
 Sensationsprozess Casilla (1939)
 Friedrich Schiller (1940)
 The Golden City (1942)
 Lache Bajazzo (1943)
 The Immortal Face (1947)
 The Queen of the Landstrasse (1948)
 Eroica (1949)
 Night of the Twelve (1949)
 The Fourth Commandment (1950)
 Maria Theresa (1951)
 Wedding in the Hay (1951)
 Have The World For Me (1953)
 Daughter of the Regiment (1953)

Theatre
 A Midsummer Night's Dream (December 1927) – Hippolyta
 Jedermann (December 1927 – January 1928) – Lechery
 Danton's Tod (January 1928) – Julie
 Peripherie – Anna

References
{{Reflist|refs

<ref name=Prawer>{{cite book|last=Prawer|first=Siegbert Salomon|title=Between two worlds : the Jewish presence in German and Austrian films, 1910-1933|date=2005|publisher=Berghahn Books|location=New York [u.a.]|isbn=1-84545-074-4|page=63|url=https://books.google.com/books?id=0RmSMWQE4LAC&q=dagny&pg=PA4|edition=1. publ.|accessdate=9 May 2014|quote=The sexes are reversed in Sidney Goldin's Jiskor (Gedenket, [Remembrance] (1924), starring Maurice Schwartz, Dagny Servaes and Oskar Beregi.}}</ref>

}}

Bibliography
 Prawer, S. S. Between Two Worlds: The Jewish Presence in German and Austrian Film, 1910-1933. Berghahn Books, 2005.
 Styan, J. L. Max Reinhardt'' . CUP Archive, 1982.

External links

1894 births
1961 deaths
German film actresses
German silent film actresses
German stage actresses
Austrian film actresses
Austrian stage actresses
Actresses from Berlin
20th-century German actresses
20th-century Austrian actresses